Tonnegrande (also: Tonnégrande) is a village in French Guiana. It is part of the commune of Montsinéry-Tonnegrande.

The town of Tonnegrande was created in 1879 on a former plantation. Tonnegrande was logging area, and after the abolishment of slavery, attracted many gold prospectors. In 1942, the towns of Montsinéry and Tonnegrande were merged into a single commune. Tonnegrande is the more modest town. The economy is mainly based on agriculture and forestry.

References

 Montsinéry-Tonnegrande
Villages in French Guiana